Littleton v. Prange, 9 S.W.3d 223 (1999), is a 1999 lawsuit that voided a marriage where one of the individuals was a transgender woman, Christie Lee Littleton. The Fourth Court of Appeals of Texas ruled that, for purposes of Texas law, Littleton was considered male, and that her marriage to a man was therefore invalid. Texas law did not recognize same-sex marriage at the time of the ruling.

Background
Christie Lee Cavazos was assigned male at birth, in San Antonio, Texas in 1952. She dropped out of school at age 15 and began living as a woman. In 1977, Cavazos began taking female hormones and legally changed her first name. In 1980, she underwent surgical reassignment and had the requisite state-issued identification changed to female. In 1989 Cavazos married Jonathan Mark Littleton in Kentucky, later moving to San Antonio.

Case 
After Jonathan Littleton's death, Christie Littleton brought a medical malpractice suit against her husband's doctor, Mark Prange. The defense attorney argued that the marriage was invalid because Christie was a biological male. On appeal, Chief Justice Phil Hardberger relied on the fact that "Texas statutes do not allow same-sex marriages" and that "male chromosomes do not change with either hormonal treatment or sex reassignment surgery" in handing down his judgment that "Christie Littleton is a male. As a male, Christie cannot be married to another male. Her marriage to Jonathan was invalid, and she cannot bring a cause of action as his surviving spouse."

The decision made it legal for a cis woman to marry a trans woman who had undergone sex reassignment surgery and transitioned to female as long as the two partners were assigned opposite sexes at birth.

In fiction
Littleton v. Prange is cited in the fictional 2010 Drop Dead Diva episode "Queen of Mean". In the episode, lawyers for a post-operative trans woman cite the case to prove that her marriage to a cis woman, entered into before she transitioned, was valid, allowing her to inherit her deceased wife's estate.

See also
LGBT rights in Texas
Same-sex marriage in Texas

References

External links
Opinion by Chief Justice Phil Hardberger, Concurring Opinion by Justice Karen Angelini, Dissenting Opinion by Justice Alma López at the Texas Fourth Court of Appeals website
 Court opinion at Google Scholar
Story of Christie Lee Littleton, personal website

LGBT in Texas
1999 in United States case law
United States transgender rights case law
Trans women
United States same-sex union case law
Texas state case law
1999 in Texas
Transgender marriage
1999 in LGBT history